The Ordubadi family (also spelled Urdubadi), otherwise known as the Nasiri family, was an Iranian family, which was descended from the medieval philosopher and polymath Nasir al-Din al-Tusi. The family was from Ordubad, a town which lay on the banks of the Araxes river, and is first mentioned during the Mongol invasions and conquests. The family thereafter disappears from sources, and is first mentioned several decades later when the Safavid dynasty conquered Iran and its surroundings in the 15th century. The leader of the family Bahram Khan Ordubadi, began serving the Safavid king (shah) Ismail I (r. 1501–1524), who appointed him as the civil administrator (kalantar) of Ordubad.

Bahram's son Hatem Beg Ordubadi, later succeeded his father as the lord of Ordubad, and received the title of "Beg" (lord). In 1591, Hatem Beg was appointed by Abbas I (r. 1588–1629) as his grand vizier, and later died 1610/1. He had a son named Mirza Taleb Khan Ordubadi, who would later serve as the grand vizier of shah Safi (r. 1629–1642) from 1632 until 1633, where he was assassinated by the eunuch Saru Taqi, due to a personal hatred he had towards the Ordubadi family, the reason being that Hatem Beg had denied to give Saru Taqi's father a post which he had asked for.

Another member of the family, Mirza Abol-Hosayn Beg Ordubadi, served as the treasurer (khezanadar-bashi) during the early reign of Safi, while a later member, Mirza Naqi Nasiri, wrote an important manual about the empire's administration apart from serving as secretary of the royal council (majles-nevis or vaqāye'-nevis) for several years.

References

Sources